The stout-billed cuckooshrike (Coracina caeruleogrisea) is a species of bird in the family Campephagidae.
It is found in the Aru Islands and New Guinea.
Its natural habitats are subtropical or tropical moist lowland forest and subtropical or tropical moist montane forest.

References

stout-billed cuckooshrike
Birds of the Aru Islands
Birds of New Guinea
stout-billed cuckooshrike
stout-billed cuckooshrike
Taxonomy articles created by Polbot